Ney Ahmad Beyg (also Romanized as Ney Aḩmad Beyg; also known as Bī Aḩmad Beyg, Nei, and Ney) is a village in Sanjabad-e Gharbi Rural District, in the Central District of Kowsar County, Ardabil Province, Iran. At the 2006 census, its population was 283, in 55 families.

References 

Tageo

Towns and villages in Kowsar County